Florent Manaudou (born 12 November 1990) is a French competitive swimmer, an Olympic champion of the 50-meter freestyle at the 2012 London Olympics, and the younger brother of Laure Manaudou, a 2004 Olympic gold medalist in swimming. He currently holds the world record in the 50-meter backstroke (short course). He competes for the Energy Standard Swim Club in the International Swimming League.

Personal life
Manaudou is the son of a French father and a Dutch mother. He first began swimming under the direction of his older brother, and later joined the swimming club of Marseilles, France.  In 2007, he was the Junior Champion of France of the 50-meter freestyle event.  In 2009, he joined the French Army and is currently in an artillery regiment. In 2022, he left the CN Marseille swim club and joined CN Antibes.

He and his sister Laure are the first siblings to both win Olympic gold medals in swimming. 
 
Manaudou was awarded the Knight of the French National Order of the Légion d'Honneur for his "eminent merits" in swimming for his performance in 2012.

In September 2021, Manaudou announced his engagement to his girlfriend of over a year and a half, Danish swimmer and Olympic gold medalist Pernille Blume. The following month Manaudou was present in the audience to support his fiancée Pernille Blume as she competed on Vild med dans.

Swimming career

2011 World Championships
In his only individual event at the 2011 World Aquatics Championships in Shanghai, the 50-meter butterfly, Manaudou placed fifth in the final with a time of 23.49. It was slightly slower than the times he posted in the heats (23.31) and semifinals (23.32). Manaudou also competed in the heats of the 4×100-meter medley relay and as the butterfly leg, had a split of 54.02.  The French team did not advance to the final with an overall time of 3:36.21.

2012 Summer Olympics

At the French Olympic Trials, Manaudou qualified for the 2012 London Olympics in London by finishing second behind Amaury Leveaux in the 50-meter freestyle with a time of 21.95.  Despite entering the Olympics with only the 10th fastest time in the men's 50-meter freestyle in the world that year, Manaudou won the gold medal in that event (which was the only event he entered). He thus became the first French gold-medalist of the men's 50-meter freestyle and the sixth French Olympic champion in an individual event. Swimming out in lane 7 in the final, Manaudou had a time of 21.34 and finished ahead of Cullen Jones and favorite César Cielo, the defending champion and world record holder.  Manaudou's time was slightly slower than the Olympic record of 21.30 set by Cielo in 2008, but was an unofficial fastest time swam in textile (that is, not wearing a high-tech suit). Going into the final, Manaudou recorded a time of 22.09 in the heats and 21.80 in the semifinals.

2012 Short Course Competitions

Following the Olympics, Manaudou competed at the 2012 European Short Course Championships and the 2012 World Short Course Championships held at the end of 2012. At the European Championships in Chartres, Manaudou won five gold medals including an individual title in the 50-meter freestyle with a time of 20.70. At the World Short Course Championships in Istanbul, Manaudou won one silver and bronze medal. In his specialty event, the 50-meter freestyle, Manaudou placed second behind Russian swimmer Vladimir Morozov (who he beat in Chartres) by three tenths of a second (0.33) with a time of 20.88.

2013 World Championships
At the 2013 World Aquatics Championships in Barcelona, Manaudou won gold in the 4×100-meter freestyle relay with Yannick Agnel, Fabien Gilot, and Jérémy Stravius. Swimming the second leg, Manaudou recorded a time of 47.93 while the French team had an aggregated time of 3:11.18. In the 50-meter freestyle, Manaudou lead the heats and semifinals with times of 21.72 and 21.37. In the final however, he finished 5th with a time of 21.64. Manaudou also competed in the 50-meter butterfly and finished 8th with a time of 23.35.

2014

Manaudou won six medals at the 2014 World Short Course Championships (including three golds) and four gold medals at the 2014 European Aquatics Championships in Berlin. At the World Short Course Championships, Manaudou broke the first world records of his career in the 50-meter backstroke and freestyle.

2015
Manaudou won three gold medals at the 2015 World Aquatics Championships in Kazan, including the 50 m freestyle where he swam the fastest time ever in textile in 21.19.

2016 Summer Olympics

Manaudou failed in his bid to qualify for the 2016 Olympic Games 100m freestyle  when he only finished third at the French national championships held on April 1 in Montpellier.  He had been hoping to pull off a 50m-100m freestyle double at the 2016 Olympic Games in Rio de Janeiro but his time of 48.10sec was bettered by Jérémy Stravius (47.97) and Clement Mignon (48.01). Only the top two finishers would qualify for the 2016 Olympic Games. Manaudou, the reigning Olympic/World/European champion in the 50m freestyle, had been the second fastest over the 100m freestyle this season.

However, he qualified to represent France in the 50 m freestyle, where he won silver, and was part of the French 4 × 100 m freestyle team that also won silver.

2019 International Swimming League
Manaudou swam with swim club Energy Standard as part of the inaugural season of the International Swimming League, co-captaining the team alongside Sarah Sjöström. He won races in freestyle, butterfly, and freestyle skins.

2020 Summer Olympics

Manaudou qualified for the 50 metre freestyle at the 2020 Summer Olympics by winning the 50 metre freestyle at the FFN Golden Tour event 'Camille Muffat' in Marseille, France with a season-best time of 21.72 seconds. At the Olympic Games themselves, in Tokyo, Japan in 2021 due to the COVID-19 pandemic, he qualified second fastest from the prelims heats to the semifinals of the 50 metre freestyle with a time of 21.65 seconds. In the semifinals the next day, he lowered his time to 21.53 seconds, advancing to the final ranked second overall. In the final Manaudou won the silver medal ahead of bronze medalist Bruno Fratus of Brazil and behind gold medalist Caeleb Dressel of the United States with a time of 21.55 seconds, which marked the third-consecutive Olympic medal Manaudou had won in the 50 metre freestyle at the Olympic Games, after winning the gold medal in 2012 and the silver medal in 2016, then behind gold medalist Anthony Ervin of the United States. He also competed in the 4x100 metre freestyle relay where his relay team placed sixth in the final.

Personal best times

Awards
 SwimSwam Top 100 (Men's): 2021 (#25), 2022 (#77)

Television 

In 2018, he appears on TV Series Section de recherches (TF1, season 12).

Controversy
Manaudou has received criticism from wildlife organisations  and members of the public on social media platform Facebook for posting a photo of himself posing with a Lar gibbon in Thailand on Facebook.

See also

 List of world records in swimming
 List of European records in swimming
 List of French records in swimming
 World record progression 50 metres backstroke
 World record progression 50 metres freestyle
 Chronological summary of the 2012 Summer Olympics
 Chronological summary of the 2016 Summer Olympics
 Chronological summary of the 2020 Summer Olympics

References

External links

1990 births
Living people
Olympic swimmers of France
Swimmers at the 2012 Summer Olympics
Swimmers at the 2016 Summer Olympics
Swimmers at the 2020 Summer Olympics
Olympic gold medalists for France
People from Villeurbanne
French male backstroke swimmers
French male breaststroke swimmers
French male butterfly swimmers
French male freestyle swimmers
French people of Dutch descent
Medalists at the FINA World Swimming Championships (25 m)
Medalists at the 2012 Summer Olympics
Medalists at the 2016 Summer Olympics
Medalists at the 2020 Summer Olympics
World record holders in swimming
World Aquatics Championships medalists in swimming
European Aquatics Championships medalists in swimming
European champions for France
Olympic silver medalists for France
Olympic gold medalists in swimming
Olympic silver medalists in swimming
Sportspeople from Lyon Metropolis